Caloptilia belfragella is a moth of the family Gracillariidae. It is known from Quebec and the United States (including Texas, Maine, Kentucky, Ohio, Illinois and Michigan).

The larvae feed on Rhus typhina, Cornus species (including Cornus asperifolia and Cornus drummondii) and Vaccinium species. They mine the leaves of their host plant. The mine starts as an underside tentiform mine that resembles the mine of Phyllonorycter species. Later instars (in most cases) roll an entire leaf evenly lengthwise, although some individuals do roll a transverse cone as is typical for the genus.

References

External links
Caloptilia at microleps.org
mothphotographersgroup
Bug Guide

belfragella
Moths of North America
Moths described in 1875